Shatarup Ghosh is an Indian politician from West Bengal belonging to  Communist Party of India (Marxist) (CPIM). He had formerly served as the All India Joint Secretary of Students' Federation of India (SFI), the students wing of CPIM and was member of its central secretariat. Then he became a member of the state committee secretariat of Democratic Youth Federation of India (DYFI), which is the youth wing of CPIM. He was also inducted into West Bengal state committee of CPIM in the 23rd Party conference of state in March 2022 and currently a member of it.

Early life
Shatarup Ghosh was born in Kasba to Shib Nath Ghosh and Shila Ghosh. His family was predominantly a leftist family though his family had not any political background. He was encouraged to join politics from a very young age. After completing school education in South Point High School, Shatarup Ghosh joined Asutosh College in 2005 to pursue BSc in Economics.  He completed his MA from Rabindra Bharati University. He is inspired by Karl Marx, Sukanta Bhattacharya, who was uncle of then Chief Minister Buddhadeb Bhattacharjee, novelist Manik Bandyopadhyay, and Russian writer Maxim Gorky.

Political career

Student politics
Shatarup started politics when he was in Asutosh College. He joined SFI unit of the college in 2005 and soon worked actively and became its unit secretary. During his tenure as secretary SFI won 19 out of 20 seats in the Asutosh College union election  and defeated their rival Trinamool Congress Chhatra Parishad, which was an "event that’s out of step with" then trends in West Bengal. His main issue was about the incident of a student and SFI supporter named Souvik Hazra, losing one eye during a clash between supporters of SFI and TMCP. The CPM's youth wing made it an issue and Ghosh extensively campaigned in the student's union polls that followed. He became the Kolkata district joint secretary in 2010–2011. In 2012 he became the West Bengal state joint secretary of SFI in the 34th SFI state conference.

Youth activism and politics
In 2013, he protested against the Death of Sudipto Gupta. Sudipta Gupta was a SFI activist who was brutally beaten by Government Police to death and his eye was popped out. Shatarup Ghosh leaded and was in frontline of the protests.

After joining DYFI, he quickly rose to prominence and inducted into the state secretariat of DYFI. He protested against denomination, NRC-CAA, rising price of fuels and unemployment. He participated in multiple strikes, bandhs and rallies. He has been one of the youth stars during election campaigns. His leadership and public speaking skills helped him rise within CPIM as a youth leader. In 2017, he was attacked in Kasba along with other party workers from TMC mobs. In 2019 he was arrested along with 35 CPIM workers due to strike. He also had an active role in 2021 Nabanna Abhijan.

He took part in the famous panel discussion at the India Today Conclave East 2018 against BJP's Sambit Patra and Mukul Roy, TMC's Chandan Mitra and INC's Adhir Ranjan Chowdhury. He is the most showed leader from CPIM who is shown in news debates or political discussions.

Electoral results
Shatarup Ghosh contested his first MLA election in a ticket from CPIM at the age of 25 in 2011 West Bengal Legislative Assembly election. He was the youngest candidate from Left Front at that time. He was fielded in 2011, 2016 and 2021 as CPIM candidate from Kasba. However he lost all of those elections.

See also
Students' Federation of India
Democratic Youth Federation of India

References

Communist Party of India (Marxist) politicians from West Bengal
1986 births
Living people